Nurmsalu is an Estonian surname. Notable people with the surname include:

Kaarel Nurmsalu (born 1991), Estonian ski jumper and Nordic combined skier
Laura Nurmsalu (born 1994), Estonian recurve archer
Sandra Nurmsalu (born 1988), Estonian singer and violinist

Estonian-language surnames